KLMJ (104.9 FM) is a radio station broadcasting an Adult Contemporary format. Located near Hampton, Iowa, United States, the station serves the Mason City area.  The station is currently licensed to CD Broadcasting, Inc. and features programming from ABC Radio.

History
The station went on the air as KWGG on September 8, 1982, and started commercial radio broadcasting on May 16, 1983. In October 1993, the station changed its call sign to the current KLMJ.

References

External links

LMJ